Yarullin Färit Zahidulla ulı (pronounced ) aka Färit Yarullin; Tatar Cyrillic: Яруллин Фәрит Заһидулла улы; , Yarullin Farid Zagidullovich; 1914 – 1943) was a Tatar composer, the creator of the first Tatar ballet, Şüräle. His works include chamber music, romances, songs and arrangement of folk music. He participated in World War II and was killed in action in 1943.

In 1958, fifteen years after his death, he became a Ğabdulla Tuqay TASSR State Prize laureate.

References and notes

"Shurale" at Mariinsky Theatre

1914 births
1943 deaths
Russian composers
Russian male composers
Tatar music
Tatar people
Soviet people of World War II
Soviet composers
Soviet male composers
Soviet military personnel killed in World War II
Tatar culture
20th-century classical musicians
20th-century composers
20th-century Russian male musicians